Hajjiabad (also Romanized as Ḩājjīābād; also known as Ḩājjī Āsgher) is a village in Mirbag-e Jonubi Rural District, in the Central District of Delfan County, Lorestan Province, Iran. At the 2006 census, its population was 77, in 13 families.

References 

Towns and villages in Delfan County